Laevipilina is a genus of monoplacophoran molluscs. They are very small, mostly deepwater animals which have a superficially limpet-like shell. All species are at approximately 2–3 mm in length, have 5 pairs of gills (except for Laevipilina hyalina, which has 6 pairs), and have 4-5 intestinal coils.

Species
 Laevipilina antarctica Warén & Hain, 1992
 Laevipilina cachuchensis Urgorri, García-Álvarez & Luque, 2005
 Laevipilina hyalina (McLean, 1979)
 Laevipilina rolani Warén & Bouchet, 1990
 Laevipilina theresae Schrödl, 2006

References

Monoplacophora